Poulithra is a village and a community in the municipal unit of Leonidio, southeastern Arcadia, Greece. It is situated on the Myrtoan Sea coast, at the foot of the eastern Parnon mountains. In 2011, it had a population of 414 for the village and 415 for the community, which includes the small inland village Pyrgoudi. Poulithra is 7 km southeast of Leonidio, 14 km east of Kosmas, 19 km northwest of Kyparissi, Laconia) and 42 km east of Sparti. It is considered a traditional settlement.

Population

History
In Poulithra the ancient city of Polichne was located, which was mentioned by the historian Pausanias in his travels. An ancient castle and Byzantine walls are to be found on the hill. In 1997, the formerly independent community became part of the municipality of Leonidio, which became part of the municipality of South Kynouria in 2011.

See also
List of settlements in Arcadia
List of traditional settlements of Greece

External links
 Polihni - Cultural and Landscaping Association of People originating from Poulithra
 Poulithra at the GTP Travel Pages

References

Populated places in Arcadia, Peloponnese